Dan Mihai Bucșa (born 23 June 1988) is a Romanian footballer who plays for Liga IV side Victoria Cluj as a midfielder.

Career

Unirea Dej & Luceafărul Dej
Bucșa started his career in his home town, at Unirea Dej, and later at Luceafărul Dej.

Dinamo București
In 2006, when he was 18, he was bought by Dinamo București, being wanted by Mircea Rednic who often call him at the first team training sessions. He played for three years for the second Dinamo team where he became captain.

Universitatea Cluj
In July 2009, Bucșa joined Universitatea Cluj, the Liga II team that was bought by Florian Walter, former paymaster at Dinamo. During his spell at Cluj, he was called at the national U23 team, by Răzvan Lucescu. After only a year, Bucșa was released by Universitatea Cluj.

Then, he was closed to a transfer at Arieşul Turda, but everything fall out in the last moments.

Return to Dinamo București
After that, he decided to come back at Dinamo București.
Bucșa played his first match in Liga I on 21 March 2012, in a game against Oțelul Galați.

Bergisch Gladbach
He was released from Dinamo in the summer of 2012 and signed a contract with the German team Bergisch Gladbach.

Return to Universitatea Cluj
After only four months, he ended his contract and came back to Romania, agreeing a contract with his former team Universitatea Cluj. In December 2014, he ended his contract with U.Cluj.

Return to Concordia Chiajna
On 21 February 2020, Concordia Chiajna presented Bucșa as their new player.

References

External links
 
 

1988 births
Living people
People from Dej
Romanian footballers
Association football midfielders
FC Unirea Dej players
FC Dinamo București players
FC Universitatea Cluj players
Győri ETO FC players
ASA 2013 Târgu Mureș players
FC Petrolul Ploiești
Hapoel Bnei Lod F.C. players
ASC Daco-Getica București players
CS Concordia Chiajna players
Liga I players
Liga II players
Liga Leumit players
Nemzeti Bajnokság I players
Romanian expatriate footballers
Expatriate footballers in Germany
Romanian expatriate sportspeople in Germany
Expatriate footballers in Hungary
Romanian expatriate sportspeople in Hungary
Expatriate footballers in Israel
Romanian expatriate sportspeople in Israel